is a Japanese manga series written and illustrated by Yasuo Ohtagaki. It has been serialized in Shogakukan's seinen manga magazine Big Comic Superior since March 2012, with its chapters collected in twenty-one tankōbon volumes as of February 2023. The story takes place in the Universal Century timeline during and after the events of Mobile Suit Gundam. The manga is licensed in English Viz Media in North America and by Shogakukan Asia in Southeast Asia. 

An original net animation (ONA) series adaptation by Sunrise was released between December 2015 and April 2016. A second part was released between March and July 2017.

Plot
The series takes place concurrently with Mobile Suit Gundam, during the One Year War but is not canonical to the original anime. Since the outbreak of the war, Zeon forces have secured the Thunderbolt Sector as it is a vital supply route to the Zeon-aligned A Baoa Qu asteroid fortress. The story focuses on Federation soldier Io Fleming as he battles Zeon's best sniper, Daryl Lorenz.

Characters

Moore Brotherhood
The  is an Earth Federation squadron consisting of former residents of the space colonies of Side 4: Moore, with the intent of punishing the Principality of Zeon for destroying their homeland.

A Federation Ensign who enjoys pounding his drum sticks on his mobile suit cockpit console to free jazz music on his pirate radio receiver. Prior to the One Year War, Io, along with his friends Claudia Peer and Cornelius Qaqa, participated in air racing events in Side 4. His father, who was Mayor of Side 4, had committed suicide during the outbreak of the war. Io is part of a GM squadron sortied to break through the sniper lines of the Thunderbolt Sector when his GM is shot down before he manages to eject his cockpit block. He sneaks through the debris, kills Zeon pilot Hoover, and commandeers his Rick Dom before returning to the Moore Brotherhood fleet. Using the sniper data extracted from the Rick Dom, Io pilots the Federation's new Full Armor Gundam prototype to flush out the Zeon Big Gun units stationed all over the sector, boasting that the sound of jazz music marks his presence. Following a grueling battle between the Full Armor Gundam and the Psycho Zaku, Io is captured by Zeon reinforcements along with the surviving members of the Moore Brotherhood. He is beaten to a pulp by members of the Living Dead Division while in captivity aboard the Chivvay-class ship en route to A Baoa Qu. The ship crashes on A Baoa Qu's surface when the Earth Federation stages Operation Star One: an assault on the Zeon asteroid fortress on 31 December, U.C. 0079. In the midst of the chaos, Io breaks out of his cell and kills the remaining guards before reuniting with his comrades.

Seven months after the One Year War, Io is assigned as the pilot of the RX-78AL Atlas Gundam and joins the crew of the Federation warship Spartan.

Captain of the Beehive. Claudia finds her position uneasy, especially with Io as her lover. She is further disgusted when the Earth Federation sends teenage pilots to her fleet as reinforcements. The war takes a huge toll on her, as she resorts to taking depressant drugs before Io snaps her out of an overdose. During the last leg of the Moore Brotherhood's operation, her fleet is destroyed and she is shot by her XO Graham, who blames her and the Brotherhood elites for the death of his family. Eight months after the One Year War, Claudia is revealed to have survived the gunshot and is currently a commander in the South Seas Alliance.

An engineer aboard the Beehive and Io's best friend. As Io seemingly has an allergic reaction that causes him to sneeze in the hangar, Cornelius often lends him a pack of tissues. Following the events of the One Year War, Cornelius is reassigned to the Spartan as the ship's engineer.

A Federation XO aboard the Beehive. He is uncomfortable with serving under Claudia. After the Beehive is severely damaged by the Psycho Zaku, Graham shoots Claudia before he is consumed by the ship's final explosion.

Spartan crew
The  is a Pegasus-class warship that serves as the protagonists' base in the series' second season.

A Federation Ensign who initially pilots an RGM-79 GM during Operation Star One. After the One Year War, she is assigned the Guncannon Aqua aboard the Spartan. Like Io, Bianca is a jazz enthusiast. She sports several tattoos on her body that represent her numerous battles during and after the One Year War.

Captain of the Spartan.

A Federation Captain aboard the Spartan. During Operation Star One, she led a special forces team to capture the Flanagan Institute labs and acquire Zeon's psycommu technology.

Earth Federation

Kenji Nomura
An ace Core Fighter pilot.

Toshiharu Nakanishi

Rina Satō
A bridge operator aboard the Spartan. She is ranked as a Sergeant in the Federation Army.

Kaori Ishihara
A rookie mobile suit pilot. She is ranked as a Sergeant in the Federation Army.

Saori Onishi
A Guntank pilot in a Federation Special Forces unit. She is ranked as a Lieutenant in the Federation Army.

Kazuya Nakai
Leader of a Federation Special Forces unit.

Living Dead Division
The  is a Principality of Zeon squadron made of amputee pilots fitted with metal prosthetic limbs. The division is assigned to defend the Thunderbolt Sector from the Federation.

A Zeon Chief Petty Officer and ace sniper. He carries with him a retro-style radio he has owned since childhood that plays pop oldies. As an infantryman, Daryl lost his legs from mortar fire during a landing raid on an enemy colony in the first half of the One Year War. While fighting against Io during a skirmish in the Thunderbolt Sector, he loses his left hand after the Full Armor Gundam pierces through his Zaku I with its beam saber. After much deliberation by the Living Dead Division to hasten the Reuse P. Device project, Daryl has his right hand amputated so his body can have full control of the experimental Psycho Zaku. Following a grueling battle with the Full Armor Gundam, Daryl is rescued by Zeon reinforcements and he sets his critically damaged Psycho Zaku to self-destruct. During the final battle between the Federation and Zeon at A Baoa Qu, Daryl is issued a Gelgoog unit, but has difficulty using the manual controls with his prosthetic arms.

Following the end of the One Year War, Daryl joins a Zeon Remnant army stationed in the South Pacific.

A Zeon scientist who is part of the  project. Her father was a historian who was sent to prison after being marked by Zeon as a dissident, and she is serving the Zeon military in hopes of her father's release. Karla supplies the Living Dead Division's pilots with their prosthetics and cares heavily about them. After Hoover is shot dead by Io, Karla asks Daryl to avenge him and kill Io. She is sent into a catatonic state after witnessing her comrades vaporized by a GM Cannon's beam saber while attempting to self-destruct the Dried Fish. She wakes up after the One Year War, but the mental trauma causes her mind to regress to an adolescent state.

A Zeon scientist in charge of the RPD project. He treats the Living Dead Division pilots as lab rats. During the evacuation of the Dried Fish, Sexton sneaks through a pile of injured soldiers and jumps into an escape pod. He was later seen as a member of the South Seas Alliance.

Captain of the Dried Fish, the Living Dead Division's flagship. Like the division's pilots, Burroughs is an amputee, sporting a prosthetic right arm. He and his main crew are killed after the Full Armor Gundam fires at the Dried Fishs bridge.

A Zaku pilot with prosthetic arms. He is seemingly killed by Io when the latter uses his Zaku as a shield against Daryl, but in fact survives and relocates to Earth after the war concludes, working as a member of an independent salvage company.

A Rick Dom pilot with a prosthetic left arm, he is described by Daryl as a "playboy-wannabe". Hoover is shot in the head by Io, who then hijacks his Rick Dom to leak the Living Dead Division's sniper positions to the Moore Brotherhood.

A Rick Dom pilot with prosthetic legs. During the final battle between the Moore Brotherhood and the Living Dead Division, he retreats to rendezvous with Zeon reinforcements to rescue his comrades. Fisher and Daryl become part of a Zeon Remnant army in the South Pacific after the One Year War.

A Gattle pilot and Daryl's close friend. After firing a direct hit on the Beehive with a Big Gun, he is killed by the Moore Brotherhood fleet's countering fire.

A Zeon soldier who wears a black face mask and has a prosthetic leg. During the Moore Brotherhood's takeover of the Dried Fish, Denver detonates a suicide bomb in the vessel's armory.

Zeon Remnants

A Zeon Newtype pilot who served during the last days of the One Year War and is part of the Zeon Remnant army alongside Daryl and Fisher.

A Zeon Acguy pilot.

Takaya Kuroda
A Zeon Gogg pilot and a crew member aboard the submarine .

A Grublo mobile armor pilot and baseball enthusiast who collects bobbleheads of baseball players. During the Antarctica skirmish, Bull faces the Atlas Gundam underwater. Despite heavily damaging his opponent, he is defeated by the Gundam's agility, and his mobile armor is crushed by the pressure of the deep sea.

South Seas Alliance
The  is a Buddhist radical cult faction aligned with the Earth Federation until U.C. 0080, when it calls for independence. Its military consists primarily of mobile suits cobbled together from Federation and Zeon units from the One Year War. Intelligence reports reveal that the South Sea Alliance possesses the remains of Daryl's Psycho Zaku and plans to mass-produce its Reuse P. Device technology.

The Reverend and leader of the South Seas Alliance. He was once a test child for the Principality of Zeon to develop the perfect Newtype until the experiments damaged his brain. Following the One Year War, he converted to Buddhism and used his Newtype abilities to create his cult.

A Gouf pilot in the South Seas Alliance.

Media

Manga
Mobile Suit Gundam Thunderbolt is written and illustrated by Yasuo Ohtagaki. In November 2011, Ohtagaki announced that he would put his other manga series, Moonlight Mile, on hiatus to start a new project, which was later revealed to be a (originally planned) Gundam mini-series. Mobile Suit Gundam Thunderbolt started in Shogakukan's seinen manga magazine Big Comic Superior magazine on 23 March 2012. In February 2022, it was announced that the manga had entered its final stage; however, in October of the same year, Ohtagaki stated that he had planned to continue the manga "for another five to six years". Shogakukan has collected its chapters into individual tankōbon volumes. The first volume was released on 30 October 2012. As of 28 February 2023 twenty-one volumes have been released.

North American publisher Viz Media announced their license to the series during their panel at Anime Expo on 1 July 2016.

Volume list

Anime
A 4-episode original net animation adaptation, produced by Sunrise, was confirmed on 28 October 2015. It was directed and written by Kō Matsuo, with character designs from Hirotoshi Takaya and mechanical designs from Morifumi Naka, Seiichi Nakatani and Hajime Katoki. It premiered on 25 December 2015 with the last episode officially aired on 8 April 2016 via pay to watch service in Japan, with early access from the Gundam Fan Club app service on 11 December 2015. The first episode was streamed outside Japan for a limited time from 25 December 2015 to 7 January 2016. A 4-episode second season was announced by Bandai Visual on 18 November 2016 and premiered on 24 March 2017. Sunrise announced in the 2017 Anime Expo that the second season will receive an English dub.

Episode list

Films
A theatrical compilation film of the first season titled  was released in Japanese theaters on 25 June 2016 with the Blu-ray release on 29 July 2016. Sunrise and Anime Limited distributed the film outside Japan. A theatrical compilation film of the second season titled  was released in Japanese theaters between 18 November – 1 December 2017.

References

External links
  
  
 

2012 manga
2015 anime ONAs
2016 anime OVAs
Adventure anime and manga
Buddhism in fiction
Gundam anime and manga
Human experimentation in fiction
Science fiction anime and manga
Seinen manga
Shogakukan franchises
Shogakukan manga
Sunrise (company)
Viz Media manga